Chaukhutia Airport is new proposed airport near Chaukhutia town in Almora district of Uttarakhand state in India.

History
As of 2017, airport survey is already completed and the location is cleared in Jhala Karchuli Haat Post Office Dhamdeval area of Chaukhutia. Main purpose of the airport is to promote tourism in Uttarakhand state of India.

References 

Airports in Uttarakhand
Proposed airports in Uttarakhand